Marinović is a Serbo-Croatian surname, a patronymic derived from the given name Marin, and matronymic derived from the given name Marina. 

Notable people with the name include:

Dario Marinović (born 1990), Croatian futsal player
Nikola Marinovic (born 1976), Austrian handball player
Teresa Marinovic (born 1973), member of the Constitutional Convention of Chile
Jovan Marinović (1821–1893), Serbian politician and diplomat
Smiljana Marinović (born 1977), Croatian Olympic and national-record holding breaststroke swimmer
Marko Marinović (born 1983), Serbian professional basketball player
Miodrag Marinović (born 1967), Chilean politician
Stefan Marinovic, New Zealand footballer
Stefan Marinović (16th century), Venetian printer
Vinko Marinović (born 1971), Bosnian football manager and former Serbian international player

See also
 Marinovich

Serbian surnames
Croatian surnames
Patronymic surnames
Surnames from given names